Yu Kang-hyun (born 27 April 1996) is a professional South Korean football forward currently playing for Daejeon Hana Citizen.

Club career
He went on trial with Slovácko of the Czech First League in April 2017. He made his league debut for Slovácko on 27 May 2017 in their Czech First League 1–1 draw at Sparta Prague.

References

External links 
 
 
 

1996 births
Living people
South Korean footballers
South Korean expatriate footballers
Association football forwards
Pohang Steelers players
Daegu FC players
1. FC Slovácko players
FC Slovan Liberec players
FK Baník Sokolov players
MFK Chrudim players
Gyeongnam FC players
Chungnam Asan FC players
Daejeon Hana Citizen FC players
Czech First League players
Czech National Football League players
South Korean expatriate sportspeople in the Czech Republic
Expatriate footballers in the Czech Republic